Reznikoff is a surname. Notable people with the surname include:

Charles Reznikoff (1894–1976), American poet
Misha Reznikoff (1905–1971), American-Ukrainian artist

Jewish surnames